Skin of Man, Heart of Beast is a French film directed by Hélène Angel. It won the Golden Leopard at the 1999 Locarno International Film Festival.

Cast
 Serge Riaboukine as Francky
 Bernard Blancan as Coco
 Guilaine Londez as Annie
 Pascal Cervo as Alex
 Françoise Bertin as Mademoiselle Espitalier

Accolades
It won the Golden Leopard and the Best Actor Award for Serge Riaboukine at the 1999 Locarno International Film Festival.

References

External links

French mystery drama films
Golden Leopard winners
1999 films
1990s French films